Muss 'Em Up is a 1936 American detective drama film directed by Charles Vidor from a screenplay by Erwin Gelsey. RKO Radio pictures premiered the film in New York City on February 1, 1936, with a nationwide opening on February 14.  The film stars Preston Foster and Margaret Callahan, with a supporting cast which includes Alan Mowbray, Ralph Morgan, Big Boy Williams, and Maxie Rosenbloom.

Plot
Private detective and former police officer “Tip O’Neill” is hired by a wealthy aristocrat to solve the shooting of his dog. The intrigue continues,  with kidnapping, police abuse, assault, and ransom  as more characters are murdered, and betrayal within his own household leads to an unexpected conclusion.

Cast
 Preston Foster as Tippecanoe 'Tip'O'Neil
 Margaret Callahan as Amy Hutchins, Paul's secretary
 Alan Mowbray as Paul Harding
 Ralph Morgan as Jim Glenray, Paul's brother-in-law
 Guinn 'Big Boy' Williams as 'Red' Cable
 Maxie Rosenbloom as Snake, Spivali's henchman
 Molly Lamont as Nancy Harding
 John Carroll as Gene Leland, Corinne's fiancée
 Florine McKinney as Corinne, Paul's ward
 Robert Middlemass as Inspector Brock
 Noel Madison as Tony Spivali, Gambler
 Harold Huber as Maratti
 Clarence Muse as William, Paul's chauffeur
 Paul Porcasi as Luigi Turseniani, mob boss
 Ward Bond as a gangster
 John Adair as a gangster
 Willie Best as a janitor (uncredited)

References

External links
 

RKO Pictures films
1936 drama films
1936 films
American drama films
American black-and-white films
Films directed by Charles Vidor
1930s American films